Tokaj is a town in northeastern Hungary.

Tokaj may also refer to:

 Tokaj (Slovakia), a wine region in Slovakia
 Tokaj wine region, a historic wine region in northeastern Hungary
 Tokaj or Zemplén Mountains, Hungary
 Battle of Tarcal or Tokaj, fought in 1527 in Hungary

See also
 Tokaji, wines from the Tokaj wine region in northeastern Hungary
 Tokay blanket, a hobo expression meaning drinking alcohol to stay warm
 Tokai (disambiguation)
 Tokay (disambiguation)